Suvarte Soedarmadji (6 December 1915 – 1979) was an Indonesian football forward who played for the Dutch East Indies in the 1938 FIFA World Cup. He also played for HBS Soerabaja.

References

External links
 

1915 births
1979 deaths
Indonesian footballers
Indonesia international footballers
Association football forwards
1938 FIFA World Cup players